Richard Pryor was an American comedian, writer and actor. 

Pryor is considered one of the greatest standup comedians of all time. 

Over his career Pryor received five Primetime Emmy Award nominations winning for Outstanding Writing for a Variety Special for Lily in 1974. He also received ten Grammy Award for Best Comedy Album nominations winning five times for That Nigger's Crazy (1973), ...Is It Something I Said? (1974), Bicentennial Nigger (1975), and Rev. Du Rite (1982), Richard Pryor: Live on the Sunset Strip (1983). In 2006 he received the Grammy Lifetime Achievement Award. In 1998 he became the firstMark Twain Prize for American Humor honoree presented to him at the Kennedy Center. He won the Writers Guild of America Award in 1974 for Blazing Saddles. He was listed at number one on Comedy Central's list of all-time greatest stand-up comedians. In 2017, Rolling Stone ranked him first on its list of the 50 best stand-up comics of all time.

Major associations

Emmy Awards

Grammy Awards

Industry awards

BAFTA Awards

National Society of Film Critics

New York Film Critics Circle

Writers Guild of America Awards

Honorary awards 
 1993 - Star on the Hollywood Walk of Fame 
 1993 - American Comedy Awards Lifetime Achievement Awards
 1997 - New York Comedy Festival Lifetime Achievement Award
 1998 - Mark Twain Prize for American Humor

References 

Pryor, Richard